The Deep End, Volume 2 is the fifth studio album by the American rock band Gov't Mule. The album was released on October 8, 2002, by ATO Records.

After the death of founding member and bass guitarist Allen Woody, the band began recording tracks using bass players that Woody had admired. Originally, there was to be one disc, but so many musicians wanted to be part of the sessions that over 160 minutes of music was recorded. At this point, the remaining members Warren Haynes and Matt Abts decided to split the project into two releases.

The Deep End, Volume 1 was issued in 2001, and Vol 2 was generally the harder sounding of the two releases although it also featured country and jazz tracks as well. The release also featured a bonus disc, Hidden Treasure, which contained live material, a song remix, and a new studio track recorded after the Deep End sessions had ended.

Track listing
All tracks written by Warren Haynes, except where noted.

Personnel
Gov't Mule
Warren Haynes — vocals, guitar
Matt Abts — drums

Bass players
Jack Casady ("Slow Happy Boys")
Les Claypool ("Greasy Granny's Gopher Gravy" Pts. 1 & 2, "Drivin' Rain")
Billy Cox ("Catfish Blues")
Alphonso Johnson ("Babylon Turnpike")
Phil Lesh ("Lay of the Sunflower")
Tony Levin ("World of Confusion")
Meshell Ndegeocello ("Hammer and Nails")
Jason Newsted ("Trying Not to Fall")
George Porter Jr. ("Time to Confess")
Rocco Prestia ("What Is Hip?")
Dave Schools ("Which Way Do We Run?", "Rockin' Horse", "Lay Your Burden Down")
Chris Squire ("Sun Dance")
Chris Wood ("Sco-Mule")

Additional musicians
Rob Barraco — piano ("Lay of the Sunflower")
David Grisman — mandolin ("Lay of the Sunflower")
James Hetfield — vocals ("Drivin' Rain")
Chuck Leavell — organ ("Slow Happy Boys"), keyboards ("Rockin' Horse", "Lay Your Burden Down")
Danny Louis — Wurlitzer and organ ("Which Way Do We Run?")
Gary Lucas — guitar ("World of Confusion")
John Medeski — organ and Wurlitzer ("Hammer and Nails")
Johnny Neel — organ ("What Is Hip?", "Sun Dance"), piano ("Babylon Turnpike")
Art Neville — organ ("Time to Confess")
John Scofield — guitar ("Sco-Mule")
Pete Sears — piano ("Slow Happy Boys")
Bernie Worrell — organ ("Catfish Blues"), keyboards ("Sco-Mule")

Production
Michael Barbiero — production, mixing, engineering
Warren Haynes — production, mixing
Les Claypool — production, mixing ("Greasy Granny's Gopher Gravy" Pts. 1 & 2)
Ron Rigler — engineering ("Greasy Granny's Gopher Gravy" Pts. 1 & 2)
Ray Martin — engineering ("Hammer and Nails", "Trying Not to Fall")
John Cutler — production, mixing, engineering ("Lay of the Sunflower")
Stefani Scamardo — executive producer
Raeanne Zschokke — assistant engineer at The Theater 99
Jason Andrews — assistant engineer at In the Pocket Studio
Phil Burnett — assistant engineer at River Sound
Halsey Quemere — assistant engineer at Chung King Studios
Greg Calbi — mastering
Steve Fallone — editing

References

2002 albums
Gov't Mule albums
ATO Records albums
Albums recorded at Chung King Studios